Eddie Polo (1 February 1875 – 14 June 1961) was an Austrian-American actor of the silent era. He was of Jewish descent.

Biography
He was born Edward W. Wyman  or Weimer  in Vienna, Austria-Hungary on 1 February 1875. With his brother Sam he was the trapeze act The Flying Cordovas. Beginning in 1913, he appeared in serials and films in the United States and became an action star in Germany in the late 1920s. After his acting career ended in the mid-1940s he worked as a makeup artist.

He was the father of actress Malvina Polo (1903–2000), best remembered as the mentally handicapped girl preyed upon for rape in Erich von Stroheim's Foolish Wives (1922). His brother was the acrobat, actor and makeup artist Sam Polo (1872–1966).

Polo died in Hollywood, California from a heart attack.

Filmography

References

External links

1875 births
1961 deaths
Austrian Jews
Jewish Austrian male actors
American male film actors
American male silent film actors
Austrian male film actors
Austrian male silent film actors
20th-century Austrian male actors
Austro-Hungarian emigrants to the United States
Burials at Valhalla Memorial Park Cemetery
Male actors from Vienna
20th-century American male actors